Burdwan Medical College and associated hospitals is a public hospital and medical research institute located in the town of Burdwan, Purba Bardhaman, West Bengal. Burdwan Medical College was established in 1969 by the University of Burdwan as Burdwan University Medical College. Later it was taken over by the government of West Bengal on 4 August 1976, and rechristened Burdwan Medical College.

It is one of the oldest medical college to teach Western medicine in Asia and the first institute to teach in English language in Burdwan. The hospital Bijay Chand Hospital associated with the college is the largest hospital in Purba Bardhaman. The college offers MBBS degree after five and a half years of medical training, M.D./M.S. degree after 3 years of Junior Residency (Academic) in various specialities and D.M./M.Ch. degree after 3 years of Super speciality training in Cardiology, Neurology.

History
On 13 July 1907, the decision was made to build a hospital in Burdwan (a small town). On 9 November 1910, the Frazer Hospital was inaugurated with 127 indoor beds. In 1921, this hospital was converted into a medical school and named Ronaldshay Medical School. However, it was closed in 1958 as per the recommendation of the 1947 Bhore committee. Later, the proposal of establishing a medical college was again put forward, and then the chief minister of West Bengal, Dr. Bidhan Chandra Roy, agreed to the proposal.

Finally, in 1969, this college was established by the University of Burdwan and named Burdwan University Medical College. The honorable health minister of that time, the Late Nani Bhattacharya, laid the foundation stone of this college. This college actually started its journey from a primary school building. The first batch of this college suffered tremendously because of the inadequate infrastructure and shifted to different medical colleges in Kolkata. The second batch of this college, enrolled in 1970, remained at Burdwan and completed their MBBS. However, the second batch took almost eight years to complete their degree. So, the official first batch of students, unofficially the second batch, came out as doctors only in 1978. There were several political unrests in the part of West Bengal during the seventies. Students also take part in the protest as this unrest hampered the growth of this medical college. Subsequently, In 1976, due to enormous agitation on the part of students, the West Bengal government took over the medical college from the University of Burdwan, and the name of this college was changed to Burdwan Medical College and Hospital.

Courses and Admission
Burdwan Medical College and Hospital undertakes the education and training of students in MBBS & postgraduate courses. The yearly undergraduate student intake is 200 from the year 2019. Presently, other than medical undergraduates, the institution is also the knowledge hub for nearly 186 post-graduates and 3 super-specialties per batch. 

This college is affiliated to West Bengal University of Health Sciences and is recognised by the National Medical Commission. The selection to the college is done on the basis of merit through National Eligibility and Entrance Test.

Hospital
Burdwan Medical College and Hospital offers a full range of medical and surgical services for patients. This hospital was inaugurated in 1910 with 127 bed capacity and named Frazer Hospital. Later, the Frazer Hospital was named after the ‘Maharajadhiraj’ of Burdwan, Bijay Chand Mahtab, and subsequently known as Bijoy Chand Hospital or BC Hospital. The century-old red-colored grand building is still part of this hospital. 

The bed strength of this hospital was increased to 759 when it was converted into a medical college hospital. Gradually, the bed strength increased to 1236, the number of sanctioned bed strengths at present. The patient load in this hospital is very high and patients from nearby 5-6 districts and neighboring states also visit this hospital. The hospital provides free of cost treatment as per the present policy of the Government.

Other than the original hospital campus, an annex campus is now there as the Super-specialty hospital, at Bamchandaipur on the NH2. This campus is approximately 7–8 km from the main hospital and is developed after modifying the Anamay Gramin (Rural) Hospital. Presently the Cardiology and Neurology wards are located in this campus with indoor, OPD, Cath lab, CT Scan and Pharmacy facilities. However, emergency patients are admitted only after referral from the main hospital. Post-doctoral trainees (DM) of Cardiology and Neurology get their training here.

Different Societies and Events
There is one cultural society and one scientific society. Cultural society is mainly headed by the students union. They organize a major annual festival, Spandana, which is a two-day long event.

This cultural society also organizes Roshnai, which is a five-day long Intra college social event, and one fresher's party named Bonzournova

The scientific society of this college is headed by eminent professors, PGTs and PDTs. They are mostly associated with various research activities.

Ranking 
The college was ranked among top medical colleges in India in 2021. All India ranking 51-100 and state ranking 3–5.

Notable alumni
 Arko Pravo Mukherjee famous Bollywood singer
 Anup Kumar Saha politician
 Sagori Mukhopadhyay eminent neonatologist
 Nirmalya Chakrabarti
 Sandip Kumar Mukhopadhyay eminent pharmacologist and Dy Director of ICMR-NICED, Kolkata
 Arpita Maitra - eminent pharmacologist and clinical researcher

See also
 List of hospitals in India

References

Details of Burdwan Medical College  on MCI's Web Portal
Report by MCI
 the official website of Burdwan Medical College, Burdwan
 the official website of the Ex students of Burdwan Medical College, Burdwan

Medical colleges in West Bengal
Educational institutions established in 1969
Affiliates of West Bengal University of Health Sciences
Teaching hospitals in India
Universities and colleges in Purba Bardhaman district
1969 establishments in West Bengal
Bardhaman